Ives Head is a  geological Site of Special Scientific Interest south of Shepshed in Leicestershire. It is a Geological Conservation Review site.

This site exposes volcaniclastic sandstones dating to the late Precambrian, around 600 million years ago. It is important for the global understanding of the early evolution of Ediacaran environments.

The site is private land with no public access.

References

Sites of Special Scientific Interest in Leicestershire
Geological Conservation Review sites
Shepshed